Mary Edith Durham,  (8 December 1863 – 15 November 1944) was a British artist, anthropologist and writer who is best known for her anthropological accounts of life in Albania in the early 20th century. Her advocacy on behalf of the Albanian cause and her Albanophilia gained her the devotion of many Albanians who consider her a national heroine.

Early life
Durham was the eldest of nine children. Her father, Arthur Edward Durham, was a distinguished London surgeon. She attended Bedford College (1878–1882), followed by the Royal Academy of Arts, to train as an artist. She exhibited widely and contributed a number of detailed drawings to the amphibia and reptiles volume of the Cambridge Natural History (published 1899).

Balkan expeditions 

After the death of her father, Durham took on the responsibilities of caring for her sick mother for several years. It proved an exhausting experience. When she was 37, her doctor recommended that she should undertake a foreign vacation to recuperate. She took a trip by sea down the coast of Dalmatia, travelling from Trieste to Kotor and then overland to Cetinje, the capital of Montenegro. It gave her a taste for southern Balkan life, which she retained for the rest of her life. On her return to London she studied the Serbian language and the history of the region.

Durham travelled extensively in the Balkans in order to write her first book Through the Lands of the Serbs published in London in 1904. In 1908 she wrote High Albania after travelling through the Albanian highlands, from Montenegro to Shkodra. Over the next twenty years she focused particularly on Albania, which then was one of the most isolated and undeveloped areas of Europe. She worked in a variety of relief organisations, painted and wrote, and she also collected folklore and folk art. In 1911-13 she helped Albanian refugees in Montenegro where she raised funds for medicine, food and helped wounded soldiers. 

She contributed frequently to the journal Man and became a Fellow of the Royal Anthropological Institute. Her writings, however, were to earn her particular fame. She wrote seven books on Balkan affairs. High Albania (1909) is the best known and is still regarded as the pre-eminent guide to the customs and the society of northern Albania's highlands.

Controversy 
After being a fervent admirer of the Serbs which saw her write Through the Lands of the Serbs, followed by an anti-Austrian and pro-Yugoslav phase, Durham came to identify closely with the Albanian cause and championed the unity and independence of the Albanian people. She was strongly criticised by the advocates of a Yugoslav state, who supported the incorporation of the Albanian-populated region of Kosovo into Yugoslavia. According to American scholars Thomas Cushman and Stjepan Meštrović, her eccentric personality and her incessant lobbying activity made her despised by the British Foreign Office. Becoming increasingly anti-Serb following the First World War, she denounced what she termed "Serb vermin" for having "not created a Jugoslavia but have carried out their original aim of making Great Serbia.... Far from being liberated the bulk of people live under a far harsher rule than before".

Other, British intellectuals who were more pro-Serb sharply criticised her views. Author Dame Rebecca West included Durham in her description of the sort of traveller who came back "with a pet Balkan people established in their hearts as suffering and innocent, eternally the massacree and never the massacrer" (Durham sued West over this) and then went on to say: "The Bulgarians, as preferred by some, and the Albanians, as championed by others, strongly resembled Sir Joshua Reynolds's picture of the Infant Samuel". R.W. Seton-Watson commented that "the fact is that while always denouncing 'Balkan mentality', she is herself exactly what she means by the word".

For their part, however, the Albanians held Durham in high regard and dubbed her "Mbretëresha e Malësoreve" (the "Queen of the Highlanders)". She was given an embroidered waistcoat by the government to thank her for lobbying the British government on behalf of the occupied city of Korçë. She was well received in the Albanian Highlands and passed unharmed despite being a lone female traveller. She benefited from the Albanian tradition of ensuring a guest's safety and from an ancient Albanian custom, the tradition of "Sworn virgins", women who wore men's clothes and were regarded as protected individuals.

When she died in 1944, she received high praise for her work from the exiled King Zog, who wrote: "She gave us her heart and she won the ear of our mountaineers". She is still regarded as something of a national heroine; in 2004, Albanian President Alfred Moisiu described her as "one of the most distinguished personalities of the Albanian world during the last century" She was also awarded a medal from King Zog for her support.

Collections

Much of Durham's work was donated to academic collections following her death. Her papers are held by the Royal Anthropological Institute, London, her diaries are in the Bankfield Museum, Halifax along with her collections of Balkan costume and jewellery given in 1935. Further gifts of mostly Balkan artefacts were given to the British Museum in 1914 and to the Pitt Rivers Museum, Oxford and the Horniman Museum, London. Some items from her textile collection were displayed in a 2020 exhibition.

Notes

References

Bibliography

 Through the Lands of the Serb (1904)
 The burden of the Balkans (1905)
 High Albania (1909)
 The struggle for Scutari (1914)
 Twenty Years of Balkan Tangle (1920)
 The Sarajevo Crime (1925)
 Some Tribal Origins, Laws and Customs of the Balkans (1928)
 Albania and the Albanians: selected articles and letters, 1903–1944, ed. by Bejtullah Destani (I.B. Tauris, 2001)
 The Blaze in the Balkans; selected writings, 1903–1941 edited by Robert Elsie and Bejtullah D Destani (I.B. Tauris, 2014)

Further reading

Mary Edith Durham (2016). Nella Terra del Passato Vivente. La scoperta dell'Albania nell'Europa del primo Novecento. Introduzione, traduzione, note e appendice di Olimpia Gargano. Lecce: Besa. 2016 
Elizabeth Gowing (2013). Edith and I; on the trail of an Edwardian traveller in Kosovo. Elbow Publishing.
 Kastriot Frashëri (2004). Edith Durham : një zonjë e madhe për Shqipërinë. Geer.
 Laura Emily Start (1939). The Durham Collection of Garments and Embroideries from Albania and Jugoslavia. Halifax Corporation
 Gill Trethowan (1996). Queen of the Mountains: The Balkan Adventures of Edith Durham. British Council.
 
 
 Marcus Tanner (2014) Albania's Mountain Queen I.B. Tauris

External links

  
 Works by Edith Durham at The Online Books Page
 Work containing scientific illustrations by Edith Durham
 Works by Edith Durham at Biodiversity Heritage Library

1863 births
1944 deaths
Painters from London
Alumni of Bedford College, London
British anthropologists
British women anthropologists
British travel writers
19th-century English painters
20th-century English painters
Scientific illustrators
20th century in Albania
War correspondents of the Balkan Wars
Golders Green Crematorium
Fellows of the Royal Anthropological Institute of Great Britain and Ireland
Textile arts
British women travel writers